Old Fort Commercial Historic District is a national historic district located at Old Fort, McDowell County, North Carolina. The district encompasses 11 contributing buildings, 1 contributing structure, and 1 contributing object in the central business district of Old Fort.  It includes notable examples of Italianate, Romanesque Revival and Art Moderne architecture built between 1894 and 1960. Notable buildings include the Bank of Old Fort (c. 1895), Rockett Motors (c. 1940), Roxy Theatre (1946, c. 1962), and Railroad Depot (1894).

It was listed on the National Register of Historic Places in 2011.

References

Italianate architecture in North Carolina
Romanesque Revival architecture in North Carolina
Geography of McDowell County, North Carolina
Historic districts on the National Register of Historic Places in North Carolina
National Register of Historic Places in McDowell County, North Carolina